Saint-Pierre-de-Chignac (Limousin: Sent Peir de Chinhac) is a commune in the Dordogne department in Nouvelle-Aquitaine in southwestern France. Saint-Pierre-de-Chignac station has rail connections to Bordeaux, Périgueux and Brive-la-Gaillarde.

Population

See also
Communes of the Dordogne department

References

Communes of Dordogne